The Bayano Caves are three caves located on the south side of Lago Bayano in Panamá Province, Panama.

The first, largest cave is approximately two kilometers long. The Río Seco runs through the cave, allowing boats to go partway inside the cavern. Though the cave receives some visitors, it is not lit. Many bats live in the cave.

The second and third caves are less accessible, requiring crawling to explore.

References

External links

Caves of Panama
Panamá Province